Labor de Medina is a town in the municipality of San Martín de Hidalgo in the state of Jalisco, Mexico. It has a population of 863 inhabitants.

References

External links
Labor de Medina at PueblosAmerica.com

Populated places in Jalisco